Joseph Tomanek (16 April 1889 – 31 December 1974) was a Czech-American artist who practiced in Chicago. He was influenced by Bouguereau.

Early life
Joseph Tomanek was born on 16 April 1889 in Strážnice, Austria-Hungary (modern-day Czech Republic).

Career
He trained at the Art Institute of Chicago and the Academy of Fine Arts in Prague and studied under A.H. Krehbiel, A. Sterba, and K.A. Buehr. He arrived in Chicago in 1910. He modelled himself on Bouguereau and was associated with the Bohemian Arts Club of Chicago.

In 1933 he painted a copy of Luke Fildes' 1891 The Doctor which has sometimes been confused with the original.

Death
Tomanek died on 31 December 1974 in Berwyn, Illinois.

References

External links 
Nymphs Dancing to Pan's Flute

1889 births
1974 deaths
People from Strážnice
People from the Margraviate of Moravia
Austro-Hungarian emigrants to the United States 
American people of Czech descent
Czech artists
American artists